Rugby union at the 1991 South Pacific Games was held at Port Moresby, the capital of Papua New Guinea, during September 1991. In the absence of Fiji and Tonga from the tournament, Western Samoa won the gold medal.

Medal summary

Teams
Competing teams were:

 Pool A
 
 
 
 

 Pool B
 

 

Note: Records for this tournament are incomplete.

Matches

Pool A

American Samoa and Solomon Islands qualify for the finals.

Pool B

Western Samoa and 2nd place Pool B qualify for finals.

3rd-place

Final

See also
 Rugby union at the Pacific Games

References

Rugby union
1991
International rugby union competitions hosted by Papua New Guinea
1991 rugby union tournaments for national teams